is a Japanese manga artist. She made her professional debut in 1979 with the short story . In 1987, she won the Excellence Award at the 16th Japan Cartoonists Association Awards for her comedy series St. 14 Graffiti.

Works

Series
 , serialized in Bessatsu Shōjo Comic (1981–1985)
 St. 14 Graffiti, serialized in Bessatsu Shōjo Comic (1986–1987)
 , serialized in Bessatsu Shōjo Comic (1988–1995)
 , serialized in Bessatsu Shōjo Comic (1996)
 , serialized in Bessatsu Shōjo Comic and Monthly Flowers (1997–2020)

Art books
 Idol  Special (SPECIAL), published by Shogakukan (1995)
 , published by Shogakukan (2008)

Notes

References

External links

 Q&A with fans at Monthly Flowers 
 

1960 births
Female comics writers
Japanese female comics artists
Japanese women writers
Living people
Manga artists from Tokyo
People from Shinagawa
Women manga artists
Writers from Tokyo